Źmicier Sidarovič (Belarusian: Зьміцер Сідаровіч) (2 October 1965 – 17 May 2014) was a Belarusian musician, singer and piper. He was the leader of mid-1990s Belarusian band Kamiełot.

Biography

In 1991 he started the Kamiełot band. In 2000 Sidarovič together with bands Stary Olsa and Contredanse recorded an album Vir (released in 2001).

In 2008 he started the Na Taku band, which organised traditional dancing parties in Žar-Ptuška café (Minsk) until 2011 and then in other places.

References

External links
Źmicier Sidarovič's homepage 
LiveJournal

Musicians from Minsk
20th-century Belarusian male singers
Belarusian songwriters
1965 births
2014 deaths
Soviet songwriters
21st-century Belarusian male singers